Serine/threonine-protein kinase 36 is an enzyme that in humans is encoded by the STK36 gene.

Interactions
STK36 has been shown to interact with GLI1.

References

Further reading